The 2017–18 Lebanese Premier League is the 57th season of top-tier football in Lebanon. A total of twelve teams are competing in the league, with Al Ahed the defending champions. After 21 rounds, Al Ahed have won the league for the 6th time in its history.

Teams 
Shabab Al-Sahel and Al Egtmaaey Tripoli were relegated to the second level of Lebanese football after ending the 2017–18 season in the bottom two places. They were replaced by Al Shabab Al Arabi and Al Islah Al Bourj Al Shimaly who won promotion from the second tier.

Stadia and locations

Table

Season statistics

Top goalscorers

Top assists

References

2017–18 Lebanese Premier League
Lebanese Premier League seasons
1
Leb